Woodlands County is a municipal district in north-central Alberta, Canada. Located in Census Division No. 13, its municipal office is located outside but adjacent to the Town of Whitecourt. A second municipal office is located in the Hamlet of Fort Assiniboine.

Geography

Communities and localities 
The following urban municipalities are surrounded by Woodlands County.
Cities
none
Towns
Whitecourt
Villages
none
Summer villages
none

The following hamlets are located within Woodlands County.
Hamlets
Blue Ridge
Fort Assiniboine
Goose Lake

The following localities are located within Woodlands County.
Localities

Anselmo
Benbow
Corbett Creek
Doris
Freeman River
Highway
Hurdy
Knight

Lombell
Lone Pine
Lonira
Silver Creek
Timeu
Topland
Windfall

Demographics 

In the 2016 Census of Population conducted by Statistics Canada, Woodlands County had a population of 4,754 living in 1,812 of its 1,950 total private dwellings, a  change from its 2011 population of 4,306.

Education
The county is within the Pembina Hills Public Schools, which formed in 1995 as a merger of three school districts.

See also 
List of communities in Alberta
List of municipal districts in Alberta

References

External links 

 
Municipal districts in Alberta